Cora Bissett (born 1974) is a Scottish theatre director, playwright, actor and musician. As a director she has created Amada, Roadkill, Grit: The Martyn Bennett Story, Glasgow Girls and Room. As an actor she had regular appearances in the television programmes Rab C. Nesbitt and High Times. She is an associate director at the National Theatre of Scotland.

Early life
Bissett was born in Glenrothes, Fife, Scotland.

She was the lead singer in the indie rock band Darlingheart who released one album in 1993 before splitting up. The band received favourable write-ups with the Scottish music press making Bissett a cover star. Her time in the band was the inspiration for her autobiographical play, What Girls Are Made Of, which debuted at the 2018 Edinburgh Fringe.

In 1995 she was the singer in the band, Swelling Meg, a three-piece "comprising acoustic guitar, bowed double-bass and Bissett's athletic voice". They performed at that year's T in the Park festival.

Between 1993 and 1997 she attended the Royal Scottish Academy of Music and Drama (RSAMD) where she studied theatre, graduating with a BA in Dramatic Studies.

Directing career

Productions include:

Amada
In 2007, she devised Amada with three actors. It was an adaptation of an Isabel Allende short story about a woman whose personality changes as a result of an accident. Bissett was the joint winner of the 2007 Arches Award for new directors for Amada.

Roadkill
Roadkill, was a 2010 Edinburgh Festival Fringe show devised by Bissett and Stef Smith about sex trafficking. The performance at the Theatre Royal Stratford East won an Olivier Award in 2012.

Glasgow Girls
In 2011 she conceived the musical Glasgow Girls with book by David Greig about a group of activists who took up an ethical fight against the deportation of asylum seekers who had settled in Scotland. In 2013 the show was shortlisted for best musical production at the UK Theatre Awards.

Whatever Gets You Through The Night
In 2012 she collaborated with David Greig, Swimmer One and other artists to create Whatever gets you through the night at The Arches.

Janis Joplin: Full Tilt
In 2013 she directed Peter Arnott's short play about Janis Joplin.

Grit: The Martyn Bennett Story
Grit: The Martyn Bennett Story was created by as part of the 2014 Commonwealth Games cultural programme. After being conceived by Bissett, it was written by playwright Kieran Hurley. Bissett directed the show, having worked in close collaboration with Bennett's friends and family to create the show.  It premiered at the Tramway in Glasgow in May 2014, then was performed in Mull.  It was named event of the year at the 2014 Scots Trad Music Awards.

Room
In addition to directing, Bissett co-wrote the music for a stage version of Emma Donoghue's book Room, with Kathryn Joseph. which was produced by Theatre Royal Stratford East and Dublin's Abbey Theatre, in association with National Theatre of Scotland and Covent Garden Productions.

National Theatre of Scotland
In 2014 she became a part-time associate director at the National Theatre of Scotland (NTS).

In 2022, she directed Orphans, a stage adaptation of the 1998 cult film of the same name. 

Gagarin Way

Bissett directed Gregory Burke’s Gagarin Way for Dundee Rep in 2018.

Acting career
In 2009 Bissett won the Best Actress at Stage Awards for Acting Excellence.

Bissett appeared regularly in the comedy series Rab C. Nesbitt, as a barmaid. She appeared in High Times. She also appeared in the 2006 film Red Road.

References

External links

Living people
20th-century Scottish women singers
Scottish singer-songwriters
Scottish stage actresses
Scottish television actresses
21st-century Scottish actresses
Scottish theatre directors
British theatre directors
Alumni of the Edinburgh College of Art
Alumni of the Royal Conservatoire of Scotland
1974 births